Ali Mebarki (born 28 December 1944 in Pierrefonds, Oise, France), represented Algeria in boxing, competing at the 1968 Summer Olympic Games in the featherweight event, he lost in the first round to Mohamed Sourour of Morocco.

He later turned professional and had 7 fights but just winning two.

Career 

 Preliminaries (1/16) Olympic Games - Ciudad Mexico, Mexico  1968 (57 kg)
 Dual Match Romania B - Algeria 22:0 Bucharest, Romania 1969
 Duals Algeria - Poland 9:11 Alger, Algeria 1967

References

Boxers at the 1968 Summer Olympics
Olympic boxers of Algeria
Algerian male boxers
Featherweight boxers
French sportspeople of Algerian descent
Sportspeople from Oise
1944 births
Living people